Adrian Sean Grenier (born July 10, 1976) is an American actor, producer, director and musician. He is best known for his portrayal of Vincent Chase in the television series Entourage (2004–2011). He has appeared in films such as Drive Me Crazy (1999), The Devil Wears Prada (2006), Trash Fire (2016) and Marauders (2016). In 2021 he acted in the Netflix series Clickbait.

Early life
Grenier was born in Santa Fe, New Mexico, the son of Karesse Grenier and John Dunbar. His parents were never married. He was raised by his mother in New York City. His mother was born in New Mexico to a family of mostly Mexican, Spanish, and some French descent.

A DNA test on a 2012 episode of the series Finding Your Roots showed Grenier to have approximately 8% Native American ancestry and that his direct matrilineal line is Native American. The program determined that his ancestor Diego de Montoya (born in Texcoco, New Spain in 1596) was the leader of an encomienda, a protectorate of Puebloan peoples in Pueblo San Pedro in New Mexico. He shares this ancestor with author and commentator Linda Chavez, making them ninth cousins. As of 2016, Grenier self-identifies as "part Apache Indian."

Grenier graduated from Fiorello H. LaGuardia High School of Music & Art and Performing Arts and attended Bard College in New York.
Adrian Grenier and Jordan Roemmele officially became husband and wife after getting married in a romantic ceremony beside their loved ones in Morocco.

Career

Acting

In 1997, Grenier left Bard to embark on a film career. He made his film debut in the independent drama Arresting Gena, then in 1999 played opposite Melissa Joan Hart in Drive Me Crazy and in 2001 starred in James Toback's Harvard Man.

In 2004, Grenier played Vincent Chase in the HBO series Entourage, gaining his most substantial notability and success. The series followed the triumphs and trials in the life of Chase, as the movie star character and his friends lived the good life in Los Angeles. It ran for eight seasons, from 2004 to 2011, and was nominated for numerous Emmy Awards, including Outstanding Comedy Series. In 2006, he played Nate Cooper, the boyfriend of Andrea Sachs (Anne Hathaway) in The Devil Wears Prada.

In 2013, he starred in the post-apocalyptic film Goodbye World alongside Gaby Hoffmann. It premiered at the 2013 Los Angeles Film Festival where it received good reviews. The film made its cinematic release in the United States on April 4, 2014.

Grenier stepped back in front of the camera in 2015 to reprise his role of Vincent Chase in the Entourage film adaptation. Filming began in January 2014 and the film was released in June 2015. In 2016, Grenier shot the heist movie Marauders The film would make it to Netflix's U.S. platform's top two in December 2020.  
He is a campus advisor for Academy for Global Citizenship in Chicago, Illinois. Grenier also starred in the 8-episode American-Australian drama/thriller miniseries, "Clickbait" on Netflix, where he played Nick Brewer. Clickbait was released in August 2021.

Directing and producing 

As a vehicle for Grenier to transition between acting, directing, and producing, with some partners, he started Reckless Productions in 2001. The company focused on producing socially-minded films. One of its first, Shot in the Dark, chronicled Grenier's journey to reconnect with his estranged father, Dunbar, with whom his mother broke up when he was still a baby. Grenier and Dunbar remained estranged for 18 years until he began work on the documentary in an attempt to forge a relationship with him. The two eventually reunited and continue to remain in contact. This was Grenier's directorial debut and the film premiered at the 2002 Tribeca Film Festival. HBO distributed the documentary and it premiered on the channel on June 3, 2007.

On June 2, 2008, Grenier premiered a new television series, Alter Eco, for which he was the producer. The show aired on the Discovery communications channel Planet Green and featured Grenier and a team of green experts showing changes that can be made to live a more eco-friendly and sustainable lifestyle.

On September 27, 2010, HBO premiered Teenage Paparazzo, a documentary directed by Grenier and produced by Bert Marcus. It premiered at the Sundance Film Festival. The film focused on 13-year-old paparazzo Austin Visschedyk and the celebrity-obsessed world in which he operates. It also featured interviews with celebrities such as Lindsay Lohan, Alec Baldwin, and Whoopi Goldberg. Aside from HBO, Teenage Paparazzo premiered on 40 other outlets around the globe. In addition to its theatrical release, Grenier took the documentary to College campuses nationwide in the Teenage Paparazzo Experience Tour. The tour included a call for art to be included in a traveling gallery that challenged the traditional understanding of celebrity and modern media.

In 2010, Grenier began working as a producer alongside producer Bert Marcus and director Matthew Cooke on the full-length feature documentary How to Make Money Selling Drugs. The film was a tongue-in-cheek look at what is considered to be one of the worst domestic policy failures in recent American history. It featured actual dealers and celebrities commenting on the subject, including; 50 Cent, Eminem, Susan Sarandon and David Simon, head writer of the HBO series The Wire. It was released in the Summer of 2013 on Amazon.com and iTunes, and it received positive reviews.

Music
Grenier plays guitar, bass, drums, and harmonica. He was a member of two New York bands: the lead singer in Kid Friendly and the drummer in The Honey Brothers before moving on to build Wreckroom, a music incubator, and recording studio in May 2012.

Wreckroom releases EPs and a video series of cover songs, titled "Under the Covers". Two bands, Missouri "punk 'n' roll" trio Radkey and metal-spined Brooklyn five-piece The Skins, released EPs on the label in 2013. Wreckroom also hosts curated music showcases in both Brooklyn and Austin.

Philanthropic efforts

SHFT.com
An advocate of sustainable living, Grenier and his business partner and film producer Peter Glatzer founded the lifestyle brand SHFT.com in 2010. SHFT is a brand that promotes sustainability through film, design, art, and culture and lives both online and offline.

SHFT has partnered with brands such as Ford Motor Company, AOL/Huffington Post, Virgin America, Stonyfield Farm, The W Hollywood, The Weather Channel, and Estée Lauder. In its second year, SHFT won two Webby Awards for best website in its category.

In 2014, Grenier and Glatzer partnered with Stone Barns Center for Food and Agriculture to create SHFT Mobile Kitchen Classroom – a teaching kitchen on wheels for high-school students in New York City.

United Nations Environment Goodwill Ambassador
On World Environment Day 2017, Grenier was appointed as a goodwill ambassador for the United Nations Environment Programme. Grenier was chosen due to his work with the Lonely Whale Foundation. In his role, Grenier advocates for reducing single-use plastic and for the protection of marine species.

Bitcoin
Grenier is a Bitcoin advocate and is developing a farming community in Texas that would use cryptocurrency for exchange.

Filmography

Film

Television

Producer

Director

Writer

Music videos

References

External links

 Reckless Productions
 Reckless Productions Latin
 SHFT
 Wreckroom Records
 
 The Likes Of This Crew
 Reckless Adrian Grenier App

1976 births
Living people
Male actors from Santa Fe, New Mexico
American people of English descent
American people of German descent
American people of Scottish descent
American people of Irish descent
American people of Mestizo descent
American people of Spanish descent
American people of French descent
Film producers from New York (state)
American male film actors
American male television actors
Male actors from New York City
Film directors from New Mexico
Hispanic and Latino American male actors
Bard College alumni
Fiorello H. LaGuardia High School alumni
20th-century American male actors
21st-century American male actors
Film directors from New York City
People from Clinton Hill, Brooklyn
American male actors of Mexican descent